The Gradaščica is a river in Slovenia. It begins in Polhov Gradec at the confluence of Little Creek and Big Božna Creek. Near Vrhovci it is joined by Horjulščica Creek (also known as Horjulka Creek). Not far past Bokalce, most of the stream is split off into the Mali Graben and the rest continues as the Gradaščica (also known as the Mestna Gradaščica 'Town Gradaščica'). This continues through the Vrhovci neighborhood into the Vič District, where it is joined by Glinščica Creek, before continuing into the Trnovo District and emptying into the Ljubljanica.

Bridges 
In the downstream order:
 Trnovo Bridge
 Rooster Bridge
 Jek Bridge

References

External links
 
 Condition of Gradaščica - graphs, in the following order, of water level, flow and temperature data for the past 30 days (taken near Dvor by ARSO)

 
Rivers of Upper Carniola
Rivers of Ljubljana